This is an incomplete list of works by Edward Thomas Daniell, an English landscape painter and etcher, best known for drawings made on an expedition to the Middle East and the coast of Lycia. Born in 1804 of wealthy parents, he was brought up in Norwich by his widowed mother. He studied at Balliol College, Oxford, was licensed as the curate at Banham, Norfolk in 1832, and two years later became a curate in London, where he was a patron of the arts. In 1842, whilst on his travels around Lycia, he contracted malaria and died at Antalya.

Daniell exhibited his paintings but was not forced to earn his living from them. His style was influenced by John Crome, J. M. W. Turner and John Sell Cotman. His etchings, of which 52 have been identified, demonstrate his great skill in the use of drypoint,

Works

Etchings
Key:
BM—work held at the British Museum in London NMC—work held by the Norfolk Museums Collections, based at Norwich Castle P—included in Inglis Palgrave's Twelve Etchings of the Rev. E. T. Daniell (1882, unpublished, copies in the Victoria & Albert Museum and elsewhere) O—work held elsewhere.

Watercolours
Key:
BM—work held at the British Museum in London NMC—work held by the Norfolk Museums Collections, based at Norwich Castle O—work held elsewhere.

Other works
Key:
BM—work held at the British Museum in London NMC—work held by the Norfolk Museums Collections, based at Norwich Castle.

Footnotes

Sources

Further information
 
 

Lists of works of art by the Norwich School of painters
Lists of paintings
Etchings